The Angus McLeod House was a historic house at 912 North 13th Street in Fort Smith, Arkansas.  Built in 1905, it was a handsome Classical Revival structure, built out of pink brick with a stone foundation, that rose to include piers for an elaborate front portico supported by Corinthian columns.  The house was one of the most expensive and elaborate built in Fort Smith at the time, with interior decoration matching its exterior in lavish detail.  The house was listed on the National Register of Historic Places in 1978; it was destroyed by fire in July 2010, and was delisted in 2018.

See also
National Register of Historic Places listings in Sebastian County, Arkansas

References

Houses on the National Register of Historic Places in Arkansas
Neoclassical architecture in Arkansas
Houses completed in 1904
Houses in Fort Smith, Arkansas
National Register of Historic Places in Sebastian County, Arkansas
Former National Register of Historic Places in Arkansas
Demolished buildings and structures in Arkansas